The Winter Road (Zimnaya doroga) is a documentary novel by Leonid Yuzefovich first published in September 2015. In 2016 the book won First Prize of the Big Book Award and the National Bestseller Award.

Overview 
The plot of The Winter Road is completely devoid of fiction and based on real events. Yuzefovich studied historical documents and personally interpreted this historical event.

The novel has the author's subtitle General A. N. Pepelyaev and anarchist I. Ya. Strod in Yakutia. 1922—1923. Documentary novel.

References 

2015 novels
Russian novels
21st-century Russian novels
Novels set during the Russian Civil War